was a Japanese daimyō of the early Edo period. He was the second son of Ōtomo Sōrin.

References

Daimyo
1561 births
1641 deaths
Place of birth unknown
Place of death unknown
Date of birth unknown